Myoxocephalus scorpioides, the Arctic sculpin or northern sculpin, is a species of marine ray-finned fish belonging to the family Cottidae, the typical sculpins. This fish is found in the Arctic Ocean.

Taxonomy
Myoxocephalus scorpioides was first formally described in 1780 as Cottus scoprpioides by the Danish missionary and naturalist Otto Fabricius with its type locality given as Western Greenland. The specific name scorpioides was not explained by Fabricius but most likely alludes to the similarity to Myoxocephalus scorpius.

Description
Myoxocephalus scorpioides has dorsal fins which are supported by 8 or 9 spines and between 14 and 17 soft rays while the anal fin has between 11 and 13 soft rays. The head and body are slightly compressed, but widest towards the head with tentacles on the parts of head behind the eyes. There are 3 spines on the preoperculum, the middle spine being half the length of the top spine. This top spine does not extend to the	margin of the operculum and so is comparatively short when	compared with most congeners. The caudal peduncle is long and slender and the caudal fin is rounded. The body above the lateral line has scattered	
plates with many small spines and elevated centres with a few small scattered plates underneath	the lateral	line. The lateral line has	its pores arranged in 3 rows. The overall colour is dark olive to blackish-brown marked with darker mottles or bands. The males have the pectoral fins marked with distinct white spots, while in females they have dark bands. The males also have dark-margined white or silvery spots below the pectoral fins and over the anal fin, dark spots on the breast, lower lip, and have a reddish-orange belly, which is broken by a wide white stripe extending from the pelvic fins to the anal fin.

Distribution and habitat
Myoxocephalus scorpioides is found in the Arctic Ocean from the East Siberian Sea east through the Arctic Ocean of North America as far as Western Greenland south to Hudson Bay and James Bay, the Strait of Belle Isle and the Gulf of St Lawrence. It is also found in the Bering Sea coasts south to Bristol Bay and the Gulf of Anadyr. Juveniles are frequently recorded near the discharges of freshwater streams in the intertidal zone.

Biology
Myoxocephalus scorpioides is a predator of benthic crustaceans. This spcies has the ability to synthesize antifreeze proteins, allowing it to withstand temperatures as low as .It serves as the host for Haemobaphes cyclopterina, a parasitic species of copepod.

References

External links
 Arctic Sculpin (Myoxocephalus scorpioides) at the Encyclopedia of Life

scorpioides
Fish described in 1780
Taxa named by Otto Fabricius